English indie rock band Florence and the Machine have released five studio albums, three live albums, six extended plays, 25 singles, four promotional singles and 29 music videos.

Florence and the Machine released their first extended play, A Lot of Love. A Lot of Blood, in March 2009. Their debut studio album, Lungs, was released in July 2009 through Island Records, reaching number one on the UK Albums Chart in January 2010. The album was subsequently certified sextuple platinum in the United Kingdom, quadruple platinum in Ireland and triple platinum in Australia. The album's lead single "Kiss with a Fist" peaked at number 51 on the UK Singles Chart. This was succeeded by the single "Dog Days Are Over", which reached number 23 in the UK and number 21 on the Billboard Hot 100 in the United States, and was certified quadruple platinum by the Recording Industry Association of America (RIAA). Third single "Rabbit Heart (Raise It Up)" reached number 12 in the UK and number 41 in Ireland. "Drumming Song" was released as the fourth single, charting at number 54 in the UK. "You've Got the Love", a cover of The Source's song of the same name, peaked at number five in the UK and number nine in Australia. A performance at the 2010 Brit Awards on 17 February 2010 saw the Dizzee Rascal-assisted mash-up "You Got the Dirtee Love" debut at number two in the UK. The album's sixth and final single, "Cosmic Love", peaked at number 51 in the UK and number three in Ireland.

The band's second studio album, Ceremonials, was released in October 2011, debuting atop the charts in the UK, Ireland, Australia and New Zealand. The album's release was preceded by the promotional single "What the Water Gave Me", which peaked at number 24 in the UK, number 13 in Ireland and number 15 in New Zealand. Lead single "Shake It Out" became the band's fifth top-40 hit in the UK, peaking at number 12 upon release in September 2011. The track also attained international chart success, reaching number 72 on the Billboard Hot 100 and becoming the band's highest-peaking single in Ireland, where it reached number two. The album also saw the release of singles "No Light, No Light" and "Never Let Me Go", which peaked at numbers 50 and 82 on the UK chart, respectively. Their next release "Spectrum (Say My Name)" peaked at number one in the UK, becoming their first UK number-one single.

In June 2015, Florence and the Machine released their third studio album, How Big, How Blue, How Beautiful, which debuted at number one in eight countries including the UK and the US and reached the top 10 of 20 countries. The album had sold over a million copies worldwide by the end of 2015 and has been certified platinum in the UK, Australia and Poland, and gold in New Zealand. It was promoted by the singles "What Kind of Man" and "Ship to Wreck", which both reached the top 40 in the UK, Ireland and New Zealand, as well as "Queen of Peace" and "Delilah".

In January and February 2022, Florence and the Machine released three compilation albums to streaming services – each a selection of eleven songs from previous albums. The first, Water to Drink Not Write About, features songs themed around water. The second, My Favourite Ghosts, is a selection of songs with supernatural themes. The third, Harder Than Hell, is a selection of love songs. All three compilations feature hand-drawn artwork by Welch.

Albums

Studio albums

Compilation albums

Live albums

Extended plays

Singles

Promotional singles

Other charted songs

Guest appearances

Music videos

Notes

References

External links
 
 
 
 

Discographies of British artists
Pop music group discographies
Rock music group discographies